Ilganii may refer to one of two places in Tulcea County, Romania:

Ilganii de Jos, a village in Nufăru Commune
Ilganii de Sus, a village in Maliuc Commune